Vindhyachal Temple, also known as Maa Vindhyavasini Temple and Vindhyachal Dham, is a Hindu temple dedicated to the mother goddess Vindhyavasini, situated on the bank of river Ganga at Vindhyachal in Mirzapur district, Uttar Pradesh. It is one of the Shakti Pitha temples in India.

According to scriptures, Vindhyachal city is also believed to be the abode of Goddess Durga. Near this place, many temples dedicated to other deities can be found. Some of them are Ashtabhuji Devi Temple and Kali Khoh Temple. It is said that the goddess chose Vidhyanchal to stay after killing the demon Mahishasura. Thousands of devotees can be seen in the temples of Vidhyanchal and this number increases even more during the days of Navaratri. The whole city is decorated with lamps and flowers during this festival.

The main deity Vindhyavasini gets her name from the Vindhya Range, literally meaning, "one  who resides in Vindhya".

Mythology 
The temple has been mentioned in Durga Saptashati. It is written that the goddess Durga was born from the womb of Yashoda on the same night as Krishna was born. When the Kansa (King of  Mathura) tried killing the baby by smashing her body to a stone, she miraculously went away from his grip and turned into the divine form of the goddess.

Accessibility 
Lal Bahadur Shastri Airport, Varanasi, is the nearest airport to the Vindhyachal Temple, which is approximately 72 km away. Vindhyachal railway station (BDL) is the nearest railway station on the Delhi-Howrah and Mumbai-Howrah routes. It is about 1 km from the temple. One can also reach the temple from Mirzapur railway station (MZP), approximately 9 km from the temple. Vindhyachal can be reached by state-run private buses, taxis and local cars. It is connected via National Highway 2 (NH 2).

Vindhya corridor  
The chief minister, Yogi Adityanath's government, has proposed the construction of the Vindhya Corridor, modeled after the Kashi Vishwanath Corridor. The corridor is being built around Vindhyachal Temple at an estimated cost of ₹224 crores to facilitate pilgrimage. The corridor is being built using pink stones of Ahraura that Jaipur, Rajasthan, and artisans have expertly crafted. Maa Vindhyavasini corridor project is aimed at beautifying Maa Vindhyavasini Temple, creating a 50 ft wide space for the 'parikrama' route and creating world-class facilities for the pilgrims. After the corridor's construction, Maa Vindhyavasini Temple would be visible from the bank of the Ganga.

See also 
 Vindhya Range
 Vindhyachal

References 

Hindu temples in Uttar Pradesh
Shakti Peethas
Mirzapur district
Tourist attractions in Uttar Pradesh
Buildings and structures in Uttar Pradesh